U.S. Route 80 (US 80) was a U.S. highway in California that continued east across the country to Georgia. The western terminus of US 80 was in San Diego, California, and it continued east through the city on several different alignments through the years. The highway went through the Cuyamaca Mountains, encountering many switchbacks, before descending to El Centro. After passing through the sand dunes, the highway crossed the Colorado River into Yuma, Arizona.

The highway replaced a 1912 plank road across much of Imperial County. The winding two-lane road through the Cuyamaca Mountains was one of the factors that led to a four-hour journey from San Diego to El Centro. During the 1930s, the road was realigned through the mountains, but several curves remained. In the 1950s, work began on constructing what would become Interstate 8 (I-8) to replace the old highway in San Diego to bypass the cities of San Diego, La Mesa, and El Cajon. This started with the construction of the Alvarado Canyon road as well as Mission Valley Road through the San Diego area, as well as construction of a replacement for the old highway across the Viejas Grade. The construction continued across the rest of the route through the next two decades. US 80 was gradually decommissioned after 1964 as I-8, through San Diego and Imperial counties, was completed. In 2006, the highway was designated by the California State Legislature as Historic U.S. Route 80.

Route description
There were multiple alignments through the downtown San Diego area. The route as of 1928 began at Broadway (US 101) and ran along 4th Avenue north to University Avenue in the Hillcrest district, then went east on University Avenue. By 1933, the routing had shifted to use Park Boulevard south of University Avenue into downtown, to end at Market Street; the city council voted that July to use University Avenue west of Park Boulevard to connect to US 101, to obtain federal funding for improving that road. The next year, the Point Loma highway was referred to as the western terminus of US 80 by E.E. Wallace, a district highway engineer. Nevertheless, the state-produced highway maps from the next few years did not reflect the change, or this choice of the western terminus. 

In the early days of World War II, some maps showed the western terminus of US 80 at the Cabrillo National Monument on Point Loma, running north on Catalina Boulevard, north then east on Cañon Street, northeast on Rosecrans Street, southeast on Lytton Street, east on Barnett Avenue, south on Pacific Highway (US 101) and finally east on Market Street, before continuing north along Park Boulevard to El Cajon Boulevard. US 395 ran concurrently along the route from downtown San Diego to the intersection with Fairmount Avenue. By 1942, the US 395 concurrency had been removed. With the completion of the Cabrillo Freeway, between 1946 and 1948, US 80 shifted from Park Boulevard to 11th Avenue north onto the new freeway before continuing east onto El Cajon Boulevard towards La Mesa. The final San Diego alignment, with signs to be placed in 1954, moved the western terminus to the intersection with US 101 where it traveled east on what was known as Camino del Rio and Alvarado Canyon Road, and then continuing on the Mission Valley road towards La Mesa. According to Caltrans district engineer Jacob Dekema, during the 1950s, the parts of Camino del Rio and Rosecrans Street from Lytton Street and Rosecrans Street to Pacific Highway were considered a part of US 80.

East of San Diego, US 80 followed the path of El Cajon Boulevard through La Mesa and then onto Main Street near downtown El Cajon before heading towards the Mountain Springs grade. The route was realigned from Arnold Way onto Alpine Boulevard as it passed through Alpine and the Viejas Indian Reservation, before entering the Laguna Mountains and the Cleveland National Forest on the alignment used by I-8. At Laguna Junction, a cafe for travelers existed from 1916 until it was removed to provide land for the interchange with I-8. A section of old US 80 — with the first few miles signed as SR 79 — continues to serve as access to the communities of Descanso, Guatay and Pine Valley; SR 79 intersected US 80 east of Descanso. At the time, the Ellis Wayside Rest/Ellis Spring provided a rest area and water for travelers; later, the state recognized it as a historic site. Exiting the national forest, US 80 continued in a southeasterly direction towards Live Oak Springs and Boulevard, intersecting with the eastern terminus of SR 94. US 80 then came close to the Mexican border as it curved around the Jacumba Mountains and into the hot spring town of Jacumba. East of there, US 80 passed by the Desert View Tower.

US 80 then descended rapidly into Imperial County along the In-Ko-Pah Gorge just west of Coyote Wells and Ocotillo before entering the city limits of El Centro.  East of El Centro, US 80 again continued into Holtville. US 80 cut a southeasterly trajectory, running parallel and very close to the Mexican border, and traversing the Algodones Dunes and the Colorado Desert. It finally reached Winterhaven before crossing the Colorado River into Yuma, Arizona. Almost the entire length of the former US 80 within Imperial County has since been designated County Route S80.

History

Construction

Route 12 was added to the state highway system in 1909 from San Diego to El Centro, and Route 27 was added from El Centro to Yuma in 1915. Before a highway was constructed through the Imperial San Dunes, travelers had to pass to the north in order to reach Yuma. The first route through Imperial Valley was originally a plank road made of pieces of wood that were tied together. The road was completed by October 1912, and portions were still visible into the 2010s. The Ocean-to-Ocean Bridge across the Colorado River was open in 1915, and a new plank road was opened that year which became state-maintained in 1917, and used a foundation of wooden rails, with the planks bound together by steel, as opposed to simple planks that were fastened to rails. However, traffic congestion and dusty conditions made travel along the plank road difficult. The delay in constructing a road to San Diego caused increased development in Los Angeles and resulted in that city becoming the trade and population center of Southern California.

A stagecoach road existed into the 19th century that passed through the mountains east of San Diego. Construction was discussed as early as 1911, with The San Diego Union and Daily Bee saying that it "will be one of the best in the system." Well before the freeway was constructed, the automobile road through the mountains east of San Diego was narrow and wound through the mountains; it was officially dedicated in 1912. This trip was known to take up to four hours, and frequently resulted in the radiator boiling over, flat tires, or broken fan belts; recent inclement weather would result in cars becoming mired in the mud. But meanwhile, Colonel Ed Fletcher declared the road a "success", and indicated his belief that a concrete road from San Diego to Yuma would soon follow, responding to criticism that a road from Los Angeles to Brawley should have been built.

US 80 was designated on November 11, 1926, along with the rest of the U.S. Routes. The asphalt road was constructed through the valley as the main east–west route, and was open by 1927. Another road was constructed in the early 1930s, to remove curves and widen the lanes. The result was a two-lane road that still had many switchbacks, with one popularly known as "Dead Man's Curve". Planning for this new alignment was underway in 1932, and much of the work was to be located at the Viejas Grade, and at the segment just west of Alpine. Paving continued on US 80 into 1934, just west of the sand dunes.

Meanwhile, Imperial County businessmen hoped to promote the use of this road over the route from Phoenix to Los Angeles, to increase tourism. Eventually, US 80 did become the most used road into Southern California from the east, but by 1947, the Highway 80 Associated was formed to increase the traffic on the road, since the war and advertising by other cities had caused it to fall again. Four years later, US 80 was reported to be the most used transcontinental highway, and there was a 40 percent increase in the out-of-state cars that traveled through the state inspection station at Yuma during the first three months of that year. But in 1954, there were reports that traffic had decreased, because the road to Phoenix, Arizona from Lordsburg, New Mexico had improved.

Early freeway development

Starting in 1932, county and state officials proposed rerouting US 80 away from what is now La Mesa Boulevard. In the meantime, parts of El Cajon Boulevard through downtown El Cajon were widened in 1935. Federal funds were allocated for rerouting US 80 in 1940; by then, La Mesa Boulevard had been designated as a U.S. 80 Business Route, and El Cajon Boulevard then carried the US 80 designation to San Diego. But in 1947, the San Diego Highway Development Association criticized the proliferation of traffic signals and businesses on El Cajon Boulevard, during the discussion of how to resolve traffic issues on US 101 through Oceanside.

World War II stalled most freeway projects in the San Diego area. Plans were developed by 1946 for a freeway through Alvarado Canyon that would connect with the Cabrillo Freeway.  Funding was obtained by 1949 for the  portion between 70th Street and Lake Murray Boulevard, and Fairmout Avenue. The first portion of the Alvarado Canyon Highway, the first freeway thorough La Mesa, was opened in early 1950. Reports indicated that this decreased the time to travel from La Mesa to San Diego by a factor of two, with 7,000 trips on the route each day. That same year, the San Diego city manager expressed concerns at the Highway Commission meeting about shifting US 80 away from El Cajon Boulevard to the Alvarado Canyon and Mission Valley Road route, due to the potential loss of commerce for businesses located near the current route.

In 1948, the Highway 80 Chamber of Commerce president complained that funds were being prioritized for US 395 construction, instead of on US 80. In September, the county supervisors approved the Mission Valley road as a limited access highway, but held off on processing the results from surveying. By 1949, the project was under way, with prisoners contributing to the labor force, and was projected to include a tunnel as well as several crossings of the Sweetwater River. A longer  tunnel through the Cuyamaca Mountains was also proposed that year, which would have been the longest in the world. But by 1950, work on the Viejas grade had stalled, due to the prison labor camp being shut down; efforts were then made to start work again. More funds were allocated by the State Highway Commission a few months later, and the work was to be put out for bid to complete the project.

Meanwhile, construction continued on the western part of the US 80 freeway. On August 27, 1951, the final link in the new freeway between Point Loma and La Mesa was dedicated. The next year, planning continued for the possibility of a freeway bypass of El Cajon that would connect to the existing US 80 freeway. However, many El Cajon Boulevard motel owners raised objections over the reassigning of the US 80 designation to the new freeway, as it would potentially harm business. In response, the Highway Development Association proposed designating El Cajon Boulevard as a business route. But in order to obtain funding for the construction, the new route would have to be added to the state highway system by the California State Legislature, or be designated as US 80. Later, a Freeway 80 Association was formed to encourage public support for the construction of the bypass of El Cajon, and the conversion of the Alvarado Canyon and Mission Valley roads into a freeway. Following the city of San Diego council and county approval, the California State Assembly transportation committee heard complaints from citizens claiming that they had not been adequately notified about the plans for US 80 or SR 94, or given enough time to provide input.

In Imperial County, discussion regarding rerouting US 80 south of the city of Holtville began in August 1953. In February 1954, the California Highway Commission declared that both the Alvarado Canyon and Mission Valley roads, as well as the new Holtville alignment, were to be part of US 80; an alignment was also chosen for the part of the highway that passed through El Cajon. A $934,211 contract was given out to construct the Holtville portion in April. Contrary to the recommendation of the California Senate Interim Committee on Highways to study constructing the freeway to replace US 80 on a new alignment, San Diego County officials decided to pursue upgrading the existing road to become a freeway. Another route through the Lyons Valley was considered as an alternative. The Highway Development Association proposed adding grade-separated interchanges on the routing of US 80 through San Diego, as well as reconstructing the interchange with the Cabrillo Freeway, as well as finishing the work on the Viejas Grade and through the mountains. That year, according to Caltrans, the interchange with US 395 was the busiest in the county.

Interstate Highway System
In April 1955, a Caltrans official announced that US 80 would be built as a freeway for its entire length in California, as it was to be included in the Interstate Highway System. In the meantime, while plans moved further along on US 101, San Diego Mayor John D. Butler asked the California Highway Commission to keep the US 80 project on track. However, the construction was put on hold because of lower traffic levels on US 80, compared to other local highways. State Assemblyman Sheridan N. Hegland raised the issue in the Assembly Highway subcommittee in December, stating that the construction of the freeway would help the economy and the Port of San Diego. State Senator Randolph Collier went even further and blamed the delay on San Diego County officials, in addition to linking the delay to damaging the program to develop the port. The bridge over the Colorado River was replaced in 1956, at a cost of $1.2 million, and was in use until 1978, when the I-8 bridge was built.

Finally, in May 1957, bids opened for the part of US 80 between Grossmont Boulevard in La Mesa and Chase Avenue in El Cajon, that would connect to the new SR 67 freeway. Groundbreaking took place on June 10, and the project was to cost $3.6 million. The rebuilding of the Cabrillo Freeway interchange became a priority due to the availability of federal funding, and due to the traffic problems encountered with having ramps entering from both the left and the right. In July, the Highway Development Association decided to formally raise the issue of the incomplete highway survey through Imperial County at the next California Highway Commission meeting. In 1958, federal funds were allocated to construct US 80 from Taylor Street to Fairmount Avenue as an eight-lane freeway, and from there to 70th Street as a divided highway. In August, the state announced that there were four proposed routes for US 80 through the mountains, including one with a tunnel. A contract was later awarded to construct the freeway from Taylor Street to the Cabrillo Freeway at a cost of $1.2 million. In November, Caltrans announced that the Walker Canyon route had been chosen for US 80, which would allow for the route to be constructed in stages, as well as being the least expensive alternative.

By the end of the year, plans were being made for construction of the freeway between Flume Drive east of El Cajon and Laguna Junction, and the portion of the freeway from Fairmount Avenue to Lake Murray Boulevard was contracted for $2.6 million. In January 1960, the Taylor Street to Cabrillo Freeway portions were under construction, including the interchange at the latter, and were scheduled to be complete by October, while the Cabrillo Freeway to Fairmout Avenue portion was up for bid; the next month, the contract was awarded for $4.6 million, with interchanges to be constructed at Texas Street and Ward Road to replace traffic signals. In July, the new I-8 designation for the road was announced, and plans to post signs were made. Another contract for the portion from Grossmont Summit near Chase Avenue to Ballantyne Avenue was awarded for $2.7 million in November.

But in 1960, Jacob Dekema, the district highway engineer, stated that due to lower traffic on US 80, the completion of the freeway through the mountains would be delayed until at least 1971. Construction of the section of US 80 from Magnolia Avenue to Third Street was contracted for $2.7 million in April. That year, work continued on the freeway, and in August, only one traffic signal was left on the highway west of El Cajon, at Ward Road. In August, Dekema announced that bids for the portion between Lake Murray Boulevard and Third Street would be opened the following month; once that was completed, the entire freeway west of El Cajon would be complete. Eastbound lanes between US 395 and Fairmount Avenue opened on November 23.

The portion from the Grossmont summit to Magnolia Avenue and SR 67 was completed in April 1961. By August, the entirety of the freeway west of El Cajon was complete, with the exception of the portions from near Lake Murray Boulevard to near La Mesa Boulevard for $3.1 million, as well as between Magnolia Avenue and the El Cajon eastern city limits for $2.7 million. In addition to this, the part of the freeway from near Grays Well to Ogilby Road in Imperial County was also being constructed for $2.3 million. The  freeway portion east of Magnolia Avenue that connected with the undivided US 80 opened on September 6. The final section in La Mesa was completed in April 1962. Construction started on the Mountain Springs portion of US 80 in September 1962. That year, US 80 west of the Cabrillo Freeway interchange was declared to be the busiest road in the City of San Diego, at 71,000 daily vehicles.

US 80 was removed from the state highway system on July 1, 1964 during the 1964 state highway renumbering when I-80 was designated; I-8 assumed the routing from San Diego to El Centro and Yuma. However, US 80 signs were posted for several years afterward on the remaining portions of the original asphalt road that had not been bypassed by the freeway. The AASHO formally recognized California's requested elimination of US 80 by 1969. Gradually, the route was removed from Arizona, New Mexico and part of Texas between 1977 and 1991. After the freeway was built, the population of Jacumba went from 400 to 200, and many businesses closed or relocated. However, the population began to increase after a few years, and residents began commuting to jobs in El Centro and San Diego. Following a campaign from the local Old Highway 80 Committee and endorsement from the San Diego County Board of Supervisors, the California State Legislature passed a resolution allowing for the route to be designated and signed as a state historic route, Historic U.S. Route 80, in 2006. In 2018, the Arizona Department of Transportation Parkways, Historic and Scenic Roads Advisory Committee adopted surviving sections of former US 80 in Arizona as a state Historic Road. This supports the California sections by extending the Historic U.S. Route 80 designation through Arizona to the New Mexico state line.

Major intersections
This table refers to the route as it was in 1942.

See also

U.S. Route 66 in California

References

External links

U.S. Route 80 - Federal Highway Administration
Finding US 80 Guide
California @ AARoads.com - Historic U.S. Route 80
California Highways: US 80

80
 California
80
Roads in San Diego County, California
El Cajon, California
El Centro, California
La Mesa, California
Transportation in San Diego